Count Yorck von Wartenburg may refer to:

Ludwig Yorck von Wartenburg (Prussian Field Marshal, 1759 – 1830)
Paul Yorck von Wartenburg (philosopher, 1835 – 1897)
Peter Yorck von Wartenburg (resistance fighter, 1904 – 1944)